This is a list of schools in London, Ontario, Canada (including Dorchester and Arva). There are two English-language school boards for London, London District Catholic School Board and Thames Valley District School Board, and two French-language school boards, Conseil scolaire de district des écoles catholiques du Sud-Ouest and Conseil scolaire Viamonde.

London District Catholic School Board (Roman Catholic)

Elementary schools 
(30 elementary schools)
Saint Kateri Catholic School
Blessed Sacrament Catholic School
Holy Family Catholic School
Holy Rosary Catholic School
Notre Dame Catholic School
Our Lady of Lourdes Catholic School, Delaware
Sacred Heart Catholic School, Parkhill
St. Anne Catholic School
St. Anthony French Immersion Catholic School
St. Bernadette Catholic School
St. Catherine of Siena Catholic School
St. David Catholic School, Dorchester
St. Francis Catholic School
St. John French Immersion Catholic School
St. George Catholic School
St. Jude Catholic School
St. Marguerite d'Youville Catholic School
St. Mark Catholic School
St. Martin Catholic School
St. Mary Choir Catholic School
St. Michael Catholic School
St. Nicholas Catholic School
St. Patrick Catholic School, Lucan
St. Paul Catholic School
St. Pius X Catholic School
St. Rose of Lima Catholic School
St. Sebastian Catholic School
St. Theresa Catholic School
St. Thomas More Catholic School
Sir Arthur Carty Catholic School

Secondary schools
(6 secondary schools)
Catholic Central High School
John Paul II Catholic Secondary School
Mother Teresa Catholic Secondary School
Regina Mundi Catholic College
St. Thomas Aquinas Secondary School
St. Andre Bessette Catholic Secondary School

Continuing and Adult Education
 Centre for Lifelong Learning, St. Patrick Campus

Thames Valley District School Board

Elementary schools 
(132 elementary schools)

A.J. Baker Public School
Aberdeen Public School
Adelaide-W. G. MacDonald Public School
Aldborough Public School
Algonquin Public School
Annandale Public School
Arthur Ford Public School
Arthur Stringer Public School
Ashley Oaks Public School
Blenheim District Public School
Bonaventure Meadows Public School
Byron Northview Public School 
Byron Somerset Public School
Byron Southwood Public School
C.C. Carrothers Public School
Caradoc North Public School
Caradoc Public School 
Cedar Hollow Public School
Centennial Central Public School
Central Public School
Chippewa Public School
Clara Brenton Public School
Cleardale Public School
Davenport Public School
Delaware Central Public School
Dunwich-Dutton Public School
Eagle Heights Public School
Ealing Public School
East Carling Public School
East Oxford Public School
East Williams Memorial Public School
Eastdale Public School
Ekcoe Central Public School
Emily Carr Public School
Emily Stowe Public School
Éva Circé-Côté French Immersion
Evelyn Harrison Public School
F.D. Roosevelt Public School
Forest Park Public School
Glen Cairn Public School
Harrisfield Public School
Hickson Central Public School
Hillcrest Public School
Innerkip Central Public School
J. S. Buchanan French Immersion 
Jack Chambers Public School
Jeanne Sauvé French Immersion Public School
John Dearness Public School
John P. Robarts Public School
John Wise Public School
June Rose Callwood Public School
Kensal Park French Immersion Public School
Kettle Creek Public School
Knollwood Park Public School
Lambeth Public School
Laurie Hawkins Public School
Lester B. Pearson School for the Arts
Locke's Public School
Lord Elgin Public School
Lord Nelson Public School
Lord Roberts French Immersion Public School
Louise Arbour French Immersion
Mary Wright Public School
Masonville Public School
McGillivray Central Public School
McGregor Public School
Mosa Central Public School
Mountsfield Public School
New Sarum Public School
Nicholas Wilson Public School
North Meadows Public School
Northbrae Public School
Northdale Central Public School
Northdale Public School (East)
Northridge Public School
Old North Public School
Oliver Stephens Public School
Orchard Park Public School
Oxbow Public School
Parkhill-West Williams Public School
Parkview Public School
Pierre Elliott Trudeau French Immersion
Plattsville & District Public School
Port Burwell Public School
Prince Charles Public School
Princess Anne French Immersion
Princess Elizabeth Public School
Rick Hansen Public School
River Heights Public School
Riverside Public School
Roch Carrier French Immersion 
Royal Roads Public School
Sir Arthur Currie Public School
Sir George-Étienne Cartier Public School
Sir Isaac Brock Public School
Sir John A. Macdonald Public School
South Dorchester Public School
South Ridge Public School
Southside Public School
Southwold Public School
Springbank Public School
Springfield Public School
St. George's Public School
Stoney Creek Public School
Stoneybrook Public School
Straffordville Public School
Summerside Public School
Summers' Corners Public School
Tavistock Public School
Tecumseh Public School
Thamesford Public School
Trafalgar Public School
Tweedsmuir Public School
University Heights Public School
Valleyview Public School
Victoria Public School
W. Sherwood Fox Public School
West Nissouri Public School
West Oaks French Immersion
Westfield Public School
Westmount Public School
White Oaks Public School
Wilberforce Public School
Wilfrid Jury Public School
Wilton Grove Public School
Winchester Street Public School
Woodland Heights Public School
Wortley Road Public School
Zorra Highland Park Public School

Secondary schools
A.B. Lucas Secondary School
Arthur Voaden Secondary School
B. Davison Secondary School
Central Elgin Collegiate Institute
Central Secondary School
Clarke Road Secondary School
College Avenue Secondary School
East Elgin Secondary School
Glencoe District High School
Glendale High School
H.B. Beal Secondary School
Huron Park Secondary School
Ingersoll District Collegiate Institute
London South Collegiate Institute
Lord Dorchester Secondary School (Dorchester)
Medway High School (Arva)
Montcalm Secondary School
North Middlesex District High School
Oakridge Secondary School
Parkside Collegiate Institute
Saunder Secondary School
Sir Frederick Banting Secondary School
Sir Wilfrid Laurier Secondary School
Strathroy District Collegiate Institute
West Elgin Secondary School
Westminster Secondary School
Woodstock Collegiate Institute

Continuing education and adult schools
Balaclava St. Learning Centre
Blossom Park Learning Centre
G.A. Wheable Centre for Adult Education
Strathroy Learning Centre
Tillson Learning Centre

Conseil scolaire Catholique Providence

Elementary schools

École Frère-André
École élémentaire Sainte-Jeanne-d'Arc
École St-Jean-de-Brébeuf
École Ste-Marguerite-Bourgeoys/ École Notre-Dame

Secondary schools

École secondaire Mgr-Bruyère
 École secondaire Ste-Marie/ École secondaire Notre-Dame

Conseil scolaire Viamonde

Elementary schools

École élémentaire Marie-Curie
Académie de la Tamise

Secondary schools

École secondaire Gabriel-Dumont

Private schools (external links)
Adventist Christian Elementary School
Agate Private School
 Al-Taqwa Islamic School
 Al-Taqwa Secondary School
Blyth Academy London
Byron Woods Montessori School
Covenant Christian School
Faith Community Christian School (closed Summer 2008)
Gibbons Park Montessori School
Infinity School 
International Test Pilots School, based at London International Airport
London Christian Academy 
London Christian Elementary School
London District Christian Secondary School
London Community Hebrew Day School
London Islamic School
London Waldorf School
Madeline Hardy School
Matthews Hall Private School
Montessori Academy of London
Nancy Campbell Collegiate Institute
Riverbend Academy
The London School
Victory Christian Academy

Weekend schools
The London (CA) Japanese School (ロンドン（ＣＡ）補習授業校 Rondon Hoshū Jugyō Kō), a weekend Japanese educational program, holds its classes at G.A. Wheable Center.

See also
List of school districts in Ontario
List of high schools in Ontario

References

External links 
London Waldorf School
Thames Valley District School Board
London District Catholic School Board
Conseil scolaire Viamonde
Conseil scolaire Catholique Providence
Altaqwa Islamic School
Westervelt College

London, Ontario